Hugh Baird may refer to:

 Hugh Baird (cricketer) (1911–1965), Australian cricketer (Victoria)
 Hugh Baird (engineer) (1770–1827), Scottish civil engineer
 Hugh Baird (footballer) (1930–2006), Scottish footballer (Airdrieonians, Leeds United, Aberdeen FC, national team)

See also
 Hugh Baird College, Merseyside, England